The battle of Brest, sometimes called the battle of the River Penfeld, was an action in 1342 between an English squadron of converted merchant ships and that of a mercenary galley force from Genoa fighting for the Franco-Breton faction of Charles of Blois during the Breton War of Succession, a side conflict of the Hundred Years War.

Breton situation
Charles of Blois, with his army of French, loyal Bretons and mercenary allies had conducted a frighteningly effective campaign in Brittany during the July 1342. This movement had begun in his stronghold of Eastern Brittany and rapidly spread into areas nominally controlled by his rival and prisoner, John of Montfort. Charles claimed the ducal title of Brittany through his wife, and Montfort was the opposing claimant to the ducal throne of Brittany; Montfort had the support of a minority of Breton nobles and more usefully, the ruler of England, King Edward III. Edward had promised reinforcements and supplies to the Montfortists the following year after the death of the old duke John III and shortly before the capture of John de Montfort at Nantes by Charles, but these men had failed to materialise. This disparity of forces resulted in a collapse in confidence for the Montfortist party in Brittany and many Montfort towns surrendered without a fight. By the end of July the principal towns of Auray, Vannes, Guémené-sur-Scorff and Hennebont had all fallen, leaving just the fortress port of Brest in Montfortist hands. The garrison there was nominally led by Joanna of Flanders, the imprisoned John de Montfort's consort, but in reality was commanded by the infamous English general Walter Manny with his 230 professional English soldiers.

There were numerous reasons for the delays in the arrival of the promised English army, including failure for county levies of archers and infantry to be fulfilled, delays in the payments due to soldiers from English-held Gascony and especially a paucity of shipping, a frequent problem in transporting soldiers to the continent from England during the wars. A small force intended for Bordeaux under Hugh Despenser had arrived in early July;  seeing the parlous state of the Montfortists this force decided to stay, but their numbers were too few to turn the tide of Charles' advance. Brest was under siege from mid-July, and was blockaded by land and by sea. A fleet of fourteen Genoese galleys was brought to Northern France from Italy by their commander Grimaldi four years before and had participated in the Channel campaign of 1338 against Portsmouth and Southampton as well as the defeat at the battle of Sluys; as such they were among the few escapees from the French fleet at that action.

The battle
The ships to transport the English army had finally gathered in Portsmouth in early August and the Earl of Northampton left port with just 1,350 men in 260 small coastal transports, some conscripted from as far away as Yarmouth for this duty. A scratch French force sent to intercept them arrived just days later and contented itself with burning down the newly reconstructed Portsmouth and terrorising the Hampshire coast instead. Just three days after leaving Portsmouth, Northampton's force arrived off Brest and saw the state of affairs with their own eyes. Northampton was an astute commander, and recognised that with the Genoese in place he would be unable to disembark his army. He was also aware that the large fast galleys could outmanoeuvre and destroy his huge fleet of slow transports piecemeal and so resolved to act immediately.

Watched by both factions from shore, the English fleet closed on the Genoese in the entrance to the Penfeld River where they were anchored in a vertical line. The Genoese did not even attempt to move, many ships were missing crews on leave ashore and the commander seems to have failed to communicate the orders to make for the open roadstead where his ships could have beaten off the English and prevented the reinforcement of Brest. Instead the Genoese panicked, three of the fourteen galleys fled from the crowd of diminutive opponents which were struggling to board the larger Genoese ships and reached the safety of the Élorn river estuary from where they could escape into the open sea. The remaining eleven were surrounded and drove ashore battling their opponents, where the crews abandoned them to the boarders and fired them as they left, at a stroke destroying French naval supremacy in Breton waters.

Aftermath
Although the battle and reinforcements were a much needed boost to the morale of the Montfortist faction, the primary effect of this battle was on the morale of the Bloisian forces and their allies. Believing that the ships carried a prodigious English force of trained warriors, Charles broke the siege and made for Northern Brittany with the remaining Genoese whilst a substantial part of his army made up of Castilian and Genoese mercenary infantry retreated to Bourgneuf and took their ships back to Spain. This disruption of Bloisian fortunes was compounded by the arrival of Robert III of Artois a few days later with 800 men and by King Philip VI who ordered the withdrawal of substantial numbers of French troops from Brittany and transferred them to Calais, where an English invasion was expected (the troops reported massing in Southern England by French spies were in fact destined for Brest too but were held up by a lack of ships). A month later, Northampton was able to beat Blois in the battle of Morlaix using his superior firepower and the corresponding shift in morale between the forces to great effect. The Monfortist faction was spared defeat and was able to begin the twenty-year campaign to regain the ducal throne.

References

Rodger, N.A.M.,  The Safeguard of the Sea, 1997,  
Sumption, Jonathan, The Hundred Years War, Vol 1, Trial by Battle, 1990, 

Brest
1342 in England
1340s in France
Brest 1342
History of Brest, France
Brest 1342
War of the Breton Succession
Naval battles involving the Republic of Genoa